Brickellia frutescens, the shrubby brickellbush, is a North American species of flowering plant in the family Asteraceae. It is native to desert regions of Arizona, southern Nevada, southern California, and Baja California.

Brickellia frutescens is a shrub up to 60 cm (2 feet) tall. It is highly branched, with many small purple flower heads.

References

External links

frutescens
Flora of Baja California
Flora of the Southwestern United States
Plants described in 1882